Goce Smilevski (born 1975) is a Macedonian writer. He was born in Skopje. He studied at the Sts Kiril and Metodij University in Skopje, at Charles University in Prague and at the Central European University in Budapest. Two of his novels have been translated into English: Conversation with Spinoza which won the Macedonian Novel of the Year Award in 2003, and Freud's Sister, which won the EU Prize for Literature in 2010.

References

1975 births
Macedonian novelists
Living people
Writers from Skopje
Ss. Cyril and Methodius University of Skopje alumni
Charles University alumni
Central European University alumni